The Victoria bid for the 2022 Commonwealth Games is a cancelled bid by Victoria, British Columbia, Canada and Commonwealth Games Canada to host the 2022 Commonwealth Games. On 24 August 2017 Victoria withdrew its bid to host the 2022 Commonwealth Games, leaving only Birmingham and Liverpool in the race.

Background 
On 30 June 2017, Victoria officially announced its bid to host the games.  Bid committee chair David Black announced the bid was submitted with letters of support from the provincial government, local municipalities and the University of Victoria.  Lisa Helps, the mayor of Victoria, revealed on 30 April 2017 that the City of Victoria was exploring a possible bid for the 2022 Commonwealth Games. Victoria last hosted the 1994 Commonwealth Games. Vancouver, which is also in British Columbia, hosted the 1954 Commonwealth Games and 2010 Winter Olympic Games and Paralympic Games.

On 24 August 2017 B.C. Finance Minister Carole James announced in a statement that the province won't contribute funding to a 2022 Commonwealth Games bid because there were too many uncertainties. She cited question marks surrounding the bid, including revenue commitments, venue locations, costs for security – which weren’t including in the bid committee’s cost estimate – and any added costs like transit, infrastructure and health services for athletes. The government agreed, with James saying they were dealing with too many other crises including one of B.C’s worst wildfire seasons in history. James suggested to bid for the 2030 Commonwealth Games.

Cost 
The total cost of the Victoria 2022 Commonwealth Games was anticipated to be in the region of $955 million with $400 million expected to come from the Government of Canada, $400 million from the province, $25 million from local municipalities and $130 million from sponsorship deals to pay for the Games.

Venues 
Following were the venues proposed for the games:

Venues in Victoria

Venues outside Victoria

See also 
Commonwealth Games celebrated in Canada
 1930 Commonwealth Games at Hamilton
 1954 Commonwealth Games at Vancouver
 1978 Commonwealth Games at Edmonton
 1994 Commonwealth Games at Victoria

References 

2022 Commonwealth Games bids
Sport in Victoria, British Columbia